Mari Shah Sakhira (ماڑی شاہ سخیرا) is a town of Jhang District in the Punjab province of Pakistan.

Temperatures here sometimes exceed 50°C in the months of June and July.

References

Populated places in Jhang District
Jhang District

